Sarzeh-ye Sofla (also Romanized as Sarzeh-ye Soflá; also known as Sarzeh) is a village in Sarbanan Rural District, in the Central District of Zarand County, Kerman Province, Iran. At the 2006 census, its population was 30, in 8 families.

References 

Populated places in Zarand County